This is a list of schools of the Roman Catholic Diocese of Des Moines.

Tertiary
 Mercy College of Health Sciences

K-12 schools

High schools

K-8 schools
St. Luke the Evangelist Catholic School (Ankeny)
St. Luke the Evangelist Catholic School was opened in August 2015 by the diocese on the western side of Ankeny at 1102 NW Weigel on a  plot of land. The initial school and church building had a cost of $8.2 million. Dr. The school initially housed K-3rd grade students. Each year following, a new grade is added until it serves K-8th grade students in 2020. On October 21, 2021 a groundbreaking was held for an expansion with a cost of $3.5 million, with $3.2 million paid through cash and gifts.
St. Malachy School (Creston)
Des Moines
Christ the King School
Holy Trinity School
St. Anthony School
St. Augustin School
St. Joseph School
St. Theresa School
St. Patrick School (Perry)
The school was dedicated on February 21, 1921.
St. Pius X School (Urbandale)
It opened with an initial 120 students in September 1956. Initially its facility was one story tall and had eight classrooms, but an additional eight classrooms were added after construction began on another section on May 1, 1962. That section had two stories. The area Catholic high school is Dowling Catholic High School in West Des Moines.
West Des Moines
Sacred Heart School
St. Francis of Assisi School - Opened in fall 2000

Elementary schools
Shelby County Catholic School (Harlan)

Former schools
Former High Schools

Former K-8 schools
 Assumption School (Granger) - Circa 2013 it had about 82-92 students. In 2016 that was down to 62. In addition to the enrollment drop, the school's expenses grew. The school closed in 2016.
 Holy Family School (Des Moines)

References

External links
 Catholic schools - Roman Catholic Diocese of Des Moines

Des Moines, Roman Catholic Diocese of
Education in Iowa
Des Moines